Self-Portrait on the sixth wedding anniversary (German: Selbstbildnis am 6. Hochzeitstag) is a painting by the German painter Paula Modersohn-Becker, one of the most important early expressionists, from the time of her stay in Paris in 1906.

Painting 
Self-Portrait on the sixth anniversary of marriage was painted in Paris. She had moved from Worpswede near Bremen in Germany in February 1906. Modersohn-Becker had decided to leave her husband and Worpswede forever, and devote herself entirely to art. This self-portrait was painted in the spring. She is turned to the right in front of the viewer and she watches the viewer with a searching and questioning look. She has a white cloth on her hip. Her upper body is naked and on her neck she wears an amber necklace.

When Paula Modersohn-Becker painted this self-portrait, she was not pregnant, as the picture shows.

Paula Modersohn-Becker painted, during the summer of 1906 in Paris, another nude self-portrait, now in the Kunstmuseum Basel in Switzerland. As far as we know, these nudes were not shown during her lifetime to outsiders, but they became known after her death in November 1907.

Provenance 
The painting was owned by Paula Modersohn-Becker's mother in 1908. By 1916 it was owned by her daughter Tille Modersohn and loaned to Bernhard Hoetger in Worpswede. In 1927, it was loaned by Ludwig Roselius to the Paula Becker-Modersohn-Haus in Bremen, Germany. It was purchased in 1988 and is today at the Paula Modersohn-Becker Museum in Bremen, the first museum devoted to a female artist.

Sources 
 Doris Hansmann: Akt und nackt – Der ästhetische Aufbruch um 1900 mit Blick auf die Selbstakte von Paula Modersohn-Becker, VDG, Weimar 2000
 Rainer Stamm: Paula Modersohn-Becker. Leben und Werk im Spiegel ihrer Selbstporträts i Rainer Stamm och Hans-Peter Wipplinger (redaktörer): Paula Modersohn-Becker. Pionierin der Moderne, Hirmer Verlag, München 2010, sidorna 9–24

References 
 Selbstbildnis am 6. Hochzeitstag av Paula Modersohn-Becker på Europeanas webbplats
 Norbert Schnabel: Eine Inkunabel der Emanzipation – Paula Modersohn-Beckers "Selbstbildnis am 6. Hochzeitstag" den 29 september 2013
 Kunsthalle Krems: Paula Modersohn-Becker: "Selbstporträt am 6. Hochzeitstag" in der Kunsthalle Krems eingelangt

1906 paintings
Paintings in Bremen (state)
Paintings by Paula Modersohn-Becker
Self-portraits
Nude art
Expressionist paintings
Feminist art
Arts articles needing expert attention
Human pregnancy
Pregnancy in art